Accipitrimorphae is a clade of birds of prey that include the orders Cathartiformes (New World vultures) and Accipitriformes (diurnal birds of prey such as eagles, hawks, osprey and secretarybird). However, this group might be a junior synonym (or at least a subjective one) of Accipitriformes. The DNA-based proposal and the NACC and IOC classifications include the New World vultures in the Accipitriformes, but the SACC classifies the New World vultures as a separate order, the Cathartiformes which has been adopted here. The placement of the New World vultures has been unclear since the early 1990s. The reason for this is the controversial systematic history of the New World vultures as they were assumed to be more related to (or a subfamily of) Ciconiidae (the storks) after Sibley and Ahlquist work on their  DNA-DNA hybridization studies conducted in the late 1970s and throughout the 1980s. The stork-vulture relationship has seemed to not be supported. Regardless of whether to use Accipitrimorphae or Accipitriformes, these birds belong to the clade Telluraves.

Cladogram based on Jarvis et al. (2014).

Notes

Sources

Neognathae